Sutton Smith (born March 22, 1996) is an American football fullback who is currently a free agent. He played college football at Northern Illinois, mainly as a linebacker.

High school career
Smith played running back for Francis Howell High School in Saint Charles, Missouri. As a senior in 2014, Smith led the Vikings to an 11-1 record before losing to Rockhurst High School (Kansas City, MO) in the Class 6 semi-final playoff game. Smith rushed for 2,046 yards and scored 32 touchdowns, 27 were rushing touchdowns and was named a 1st Team All-State running back by the Missouri Football Coaches Association and the Missouri Sports Writers Association. Channel 5 (KSDK) named Smith their Large School Player of the Year and the St. Louis Post-Dispatch named him their All-Metro Offensive Player of the Year. In 2014 Smith was a top 20 recruit in the State of Missouri and was listed as a 3-star recruit by ESPN and 247Sports.

College career
Smith red-shirted his freshman season at Northern Illinois University, to focus on making the switch from running back to linebacker.

In his red-shirt sophomore season, Smith led the nation in sacks (14), tackles for loss (29.5), and quarterback pressures (73). This led to him being a 2017 consensus All-American, including first team selections by the Walter Camp Foundation and the Football Writers Association of America. He was also named Mid-American Conference defensive player of the year. Smith became the 2nd player in NIU history since LeShon Johnson in 1993 to be named a Consensus All-American. Smith broke NIU's single season tackles for loss record previously held by Scott Kellar (20). His FBS leading 14 quarterback sacks broke the single season sack record (12), previously held by Scott Kellar (1984) and Larry English (2006). Smith was a finalist for the 2017 Ted Hendricks Award as the nation's best defensive end. The Maxwell Football Club named Smith a semi-finalist for the Chuck Bednarik Award, the nation's Most Outstanding Defensive Player of the Year.

In his red-shirt junior season, Smith led the nation in tackles for loss (27) and was third in the nation in sacks (15). Smith helped lead the 2018 NIU Huskies to a MAC West Division championship as well as a 30-29 win over Buffalo in the 2018 Marathon MAC Championship Game. Following the game, Smith was named the game's Most Valuable Defensive player. For a second consecutive year, Smith was named a First-Team All-American, including first-team selections by the Associated Press, ESPN, SI.com, CollegeFootballNews.com and USA Today. Smith was a second-team selection by The Walter Camp Football Association, American Football Coaches Association (AFCA), PFF, and the Football Writers Association of America. Smith was also a finalist for the 2018 Ted Hendricks Award as the nation's best defensive end. PFF ranked Smith 24th on their list of the best 101 college football players in America. The Mid-American Conference named Smith a First-Team Defensive End and MAC Defensive Player of the Year. Smith also won the Vern Smith Leadership Award which is the football MVP award for the Mid-American Conference. Sutton Smith is only the third defensive player in the history of the Mid-American Conference to win the Vern Smith MVP honor, joining Central Michigan linebacker Ray Bentley (1982) and NIU defensive end Larry English (2008).

On December 20, 2018, Smith announced that he would forgo his final year of eligibility to declare for the 2019 NFL Draft.

During his collegiate career, Smith was a 2-time First-Team All-American, a 2-time First-Team Mid-American Conference Defensive End, and 2-Time Mid-American Conference Defensive Player of the Year. He is the only player in NIU school history to achieve these honors in back-to-back seasons and is the most decorated defensive player in NIU football history. In 2019, both Northern Illinois Football and the College Football Hall of Fame named Smith to their All-Decade Teams.

Professional career

Pittsburgh Steelers
Smith was drafted by the Pittsburgh Steelers in the sixth round, 175th overall, of the 2019 NFL Draft. He was waived on August 31, 2019.

Jacksonville Jaguars
On October 22, 2019, Smith was signed to the Jacksonville Jaguars practice squad, but was released a week later.

Pittsburgh Steelers (second stint)
On November 6, 2019, Smith was signed to the Pittsburgh Steelers practice squad, but was released the next day. On November 12, he was re-signed to the practice squad. He was released on November 18.

Seattle Seahawks
On December 18, 2019, Smith was signed to the Seattle Seahawks practice squad. He signed a reserve/future contract with the Seahawks on January 14, 2020. He was waived on July 26, 2020.

New Orleans Saints
Smith signed with the New Orleans Saints on May 14, 2021.  He was released on August 27, 2021.

Las Vegas Raiders
On November 15, 2021, Smith was signed to the Las Vegas Raiders practice squad, after a season-ending injury to fullback Alec Ingold. He was elevated to the active roster on November 21, and played in his first career NFL game, getting snaps on special teams vs the Cincinnati Bengals in week 11. He was elevated again for the week 12 game of the Raiders versus the Dallas Cowboys, before being signed to a two-year contract on December 3. He also played in week 13 against the Washington Football Team, in week 14 against the Kansas City Chiefs, and week 15 against the Cleveland Browns, mostly on special teams and limited snaps on offense, not registering a rushing attempt. He was released on May 20, 2022.

References

External links
Northern Illinois bio

1996 births
Living people
All-American college football players
American football defensive ends
Jacksonville Jaguars players
Las Vegas Raiders players
New Orleans Saints players
Northern Illinois Huskies football players
People from St. Charles, Missouri
Pittsburgh Steelers players
Players of American football from Missouri
Seattle Seahawks players
Sportspeople from Greater St. Louis